"Take Good Care of Her" is a 1961 song written by Arthur Kent and Ed Warren and recorded by Adam Wade. It reached number twenty on the R&B charts and number seven on the Hot 100. In the song, the narrator speaks to the groom of his ex-girlfriend.

Cover versions
In 1962, Johnny Tillotson covered the song on his album It Keeps Right On a-Hurtin'.
In 1963, Dean Martin covered the song on his album Dean "Tex" Martin Rides Again. 
In 1966, Sonny James had a number one country hit with his version of the song. It was the fourth among his 23 No. 1 singles.
Later that year, Mel Carter recorded the song and reached #78 on US pop charts.
In 1973, Elvis Presley recorded a version of the song.  The B-Side was "I've Got a Thing About You Baby".
In the same year, Johnny Mathis (in whom Wade had an exact vocal style early in his career) reached #40 on Adult Contemporary charts.

Chart performance

Adam Wade

Sonny James

Johnny Mathis

Elvis Presley

Bobbie Evans

References
 

1961 singles
1966 singles
1974 singles
Sonny James songs
Elvis Presley songs
Gene McDaniels songs
Johnny Mathis songs
Adam Wade (singer) songs
Capitol Records singles
1961 songs
Pop ballads
Country ballads